These are the official results of the Men's Long Jump event at the 1983 IAAF World Championships in Helsinki, Finland. There were a total of 34 participating athletes, with two qualifying groups and the final held on 10 August 1983.

Medalists

Schedule
All times are Eastern European Time (UTC+2)

Abbreviations
All results shown are in metres

Records

Qualification

Group A

Group B

Final

See also
 1980 Men's Olympic Long Jump (Moscow)
 1982 Men's European Championships Long Jump (Athens)
 1984 Men's Olympic Long Jump (Los Angeles)
 1986 Men's European Championships Long Jump (Stuttgart)
 1987 Men's World Championships Long Jump (Rome)

References
 Results

L
Long jump at the World Athletics Championships